A Year with Swollen Appendices is a book by Brian Eno. The paperback book was published by Faber and Faber in 1996 and is divided into two sections. The first part is a diary covering the year 1995, the second part, the 'swollen appendices' of the title is a collection of essays, short stories and correspondence. It was re-released with a new introduction by the author in 2021.

Diary

The diary covers the year 1995, which proved to be particularly productive for Eno. It details four different musical projects he was involved in: the album Spinner with Jah Wobble, the Passengers album Original Soundtracks 1 with U2, David Bowie's Outside and the War Child charity album The Help Album as well as exploratory sessions with the band James.

In addition it covers various other projects Eno was involved in, in particular his opposition to the attacks on Bosnia by Croatia. Throughout the diaries there is correspondence between Eno and Stewart Brand, largely dealing with this subject.

The diary covers the period of Eno's life during which he used SSEYO's Koan Pro software to create generative music, work which led to the 1996 publication of his title Generative Music 1 with SSEYO Koan Software. The cover of the diary is shared with this software title.

Appendices
The appendices, which are delineated by pink paper in the original book, cover a number of different topics with some of the writing dating as far back as 1978. The essays cover subjects closely linked with Eno such as ambient music, generative music, music copyright, the role of an artist and art. In addition there is correspondence, interviews and short stories.

It is rumoured that the title is a play on words as well. His publicist, Michelle Ferguson, who worked with him throughout the year suffered a burst appendix by the end of his busy year at the Pavarotti War Child Concert event in Modena with U2.

Cover
The cover photograph is by Anton Corbijn.

See also
More Dark Than Shark (1986)
I Dormienti (2000)

References

Brian Eno
1995 books
Diaries
Music autobiographies
Faber and Faber books